The 32nd Annual Annie Awards were held on January 30, 2005, at the Alex Theatre in Glendale, California. Nominations were announced on December 6, 2004. The award show is hosted by Tom Kenny. Major awards given include Best Animated Feature for The Incredibles, Best Home Entertainment Production for The Lion King 1½, Best Animated Short Subject for Lorenzo, Best Animated Television Commercial for United Airlines - "Interview", and Best Animated Television Production for SpongeBob SquarePants.

Winners and nominees
Nominations announced on December 6, 2004. Winners are highlighted in boldface.

Best Animated Feature
 The Incredibles
 Ghost in the Shell 2: Innocence
 Shrek 2
 The SpongeBob SquarePants Movie

Best Home Entertainment Production
 The Lion King 1½
 Mickey, Donald, Goofy: The Three Musketeers
 Scooby-Doo! and the Loch Ness Monster

Best Animated Short Subject
 Agricultural Report
 It's 'The Cat Lorenzo Rockfish
 Ryan

Best Animated Television Commercial
 Looney Tunes AFLAC
 Nintendo - "Freeboy"
 Quaker Chewy Bars - "Three Bears"
 Reebok
 United Airlines - "Interview"Best Animated Television Production
 Foster's Home for Imaginary Friends
 My Life as a Teenage Robot
 SpongeBob SquarePants' Star Wars: Clone Wars The Batman''

References

External links
 32nd Annual Annie Nominations and Awards Recipients

2004
Glendale, California
2004 film awards
Annie
Annie